Cadence Bank is a commercial bank with dual headquarters in Tupelo, Mississippi and Houston, Texas with operations in Alabama, Arkansas, Florida, Georgia, Louisiana, Mississippi, Missouri, Tennessee, Texas, and Illinois. In 1876, Raymond Trice and Company received a charter to create a bank in its hardware store in Verona, Mississippi. In 1886, the banking operation was moved to Tupelo, Mississippi and the company was renamed to Bank of Lee County, Mississippi. Soon after, it was renamed to the Bank of Tupelo. The bank was renamed to Bank of Mississippi in 1966. In 1997, the bank changed its name to BancorpSouth. In October 2021, the bank changed its name to Cadence Bank. It has the naming rights to Cadence Bank Amphitheatre in Atlanta and Cadence Bank Arena in Tupelo.

History 
In 1987, the bank acquired First Mississippi National Bank.

In 1992, the bank acquired Volunteer Bank of Jackson.

In 1998, the bank acquired Alabama Bancorp.

In April 2000, the bank acquired First United Bancshares of El Dorado, Arkansas. First United Bancshares was acquired for $455 million in a tax-free exchange of stock where BancorpSouth gave 1.125 shares of its common stock for each share of First United Bancshares stock.

In 2002, the bank acquired Pinnacle Bancshares.

In 2004, the bank acquired Business Bank of Baton Rouge, Louisiana, and Premier Bank of Brentwood, Tennessee.

In 2005, the bank acquired American State Bank of Jonesboro, Arkansas.

In October 2006, the bank acquired City Bancorp of Springfield, Missouri for $170 million with half consisting of BancorpSouth stock and the remainder in cash.

In January 2014, the bank acquired Ouachita Bancshares Corp. of Monroe, Louisiana and Central Community Corporation of Temple, Texas. Ouachita Bancshares Corp. was purchased for 3,675,000 shares of BancorpSouth's common stock plus $22.875 million in cash. Central Community Corporation was purchased for 7,250,000 shares of BancorpSouth's common stock plus $28.5 million in cash. After nearly four years and multiple extension of completion dates, the bank received the necessary approvals in late 2017 to close the transactions. Both mergers were completed effective January 15, 2018.

In July 2017, the bank reorganized to eliminate redundant corporate infrastructure and activities. BancorpSouth, Inc. was merged with and into its wholly owned bank subsidiary, BancorpSouth Bank. The reorganization left BancorpSouth Bank as the surviving entity. This left BancorpSouth Bank being regulated by the Federal Deposit Insurance Corporation and the Mississippi Department of Banking and Consumer Finance. Before the reorganization, BancorpSouth, Inc. was regulated by the Federal Reserve as a bank holding company.

In April 2018, the bank acquired Icon Capital Corporation and its wholly owned subsidiary Icon Bank of Texas, National Association of Houston, Texas for 4,125,000 shares of BancorpSouth's common stock plus $17.5 million in cash. The merger was completed on October 1, 2018, and folds in seven open full-service banking offices as well as two not-yet-opened full-service banking offices into BancorpSouth's footprint.

In November 2018, the bank acquired Casey Bancorp, Inc. of Grand Prairie, Texas and its wholly owned subsidiary, Grand Bank of Texas. Also, the bank acquired Merchants Trust, Inc. of Jackson, Alabama and its wholly owned subsidiary, Merchants Bank. Casey Bancorp, Inc. was purchased for 1,275,000 shares of BancorpSouth's common stock plus $11.000 million in cash with the agreement providing a collar with respect to the total deal value ranging from $51.750 million to $56.750 million. Merchants Trust, Inc. was purchased for 950,000 shares of BancorpSouth's common stock plus $8.000 million in cash with the agreement providing a collar with respect to the total deal value ranging from $37.500 million to $43.000 million. Both mergers were completed effective April 1, 2019.

In March 2019, the bank acquired Van Alstyne Financial Corporation of Van Alstyne, Texas and its wholly owned subsidiary, Texas Star Bank. Also, the bank acquired Summit Financial Enterprises, Inc. of Panama City, Florida and its wholly owned subsidiary Summit Bank, National Association. Van Alstyne Financial Corporation was purchased for 2,100,000 shares of BancorpSouth's common stock plus $20.500 million in cash with the agreement providing a collar with respect to the total deal value ranging from $80.000 million to $86.700 million. Summit Financial Enterprises, Inc. was purchased for 2,500,000 shares of BancorpSouth's common stock plus $20.000 million in cash with the agreement providing a collar with respect to the total deal value ranging from $95.000 million to $107.500 million. Both mergers were completed effective September 1, 2019.

In September 2019, the bank acquired Texas First Bancshares, Inc. of Waco, Texas and its wholly owned subsidiary, Texas First State Bank for 1,065,000 shares of BancorpSouth's common stock plus $13.0 million in cash. The terms of the merger agreement provide for a collar with respect to the total deal value ranging from $38.8 million to $46.5 million. The merger was completed on January 1, 2020.

In April 2021, BancorpSouth Bank entered into a merger agreement with Cadence Bancorporation, with the merged entity using the Cadence Bank name. The merger was completed on October 29, 2021.

Insurance acquisitions
In April 1999, the bank acquired Stewart, Sneed, Hewes Group of Gulfport, Mississippi.

In April 2003, the bank acquired WMS, LLC of Baton Rouge, Louisiana, which operated under the name of Wright & Percy Insurance. Also, in July of the same year, the bank acquired Ramsey, Krug, Farrell and Lensing, Inc. of Little Rock, Arkansas.

In February 2008, the bank acquired JMG/IC Insurance Agency, Inc. of Nacogdoches, Texas.

In June 2012, the bank acquired The Securance Group, Inc. of Brewton, Alabama.

In December 2013, the bank acquired GEM Insurance Agencies of Houston, Texas.

In April 2014, the bank acquired Knox Insurance Group, LLC of Lafayette, Louisiana.

In December 2016, the bank acquired Waguespack & Associates Insurance, Inc. of Gonzales, Louisiana.

Services offered
Cadence offers checking and savings accounts, loans, credit cards, wealth management, insurance, and financial advice. It also offers conforming, FHA, Jumbo, VA, and USDA mortgages as well as HELOCs. For businesses, it offers small business banking and treasury management services.

References

External links

 

American companies established in 1876
Banks established in 1876
Banks based in Mississippi
Banks based in Texas
Companies listed on the New York Stock Exchange
Economy of the Southeastern United States
Tupelo, Mississippi
1876 establishments in Mississippi
Companies based in Houston